The National Defence and Security Council (abbreviated NDSC) is an eleven-member national security council responsible for security and defence affairs in Myanmar. Though the president is the chief executive of the government of Myanmar, the 2008 Constitution reserves certain important executive powers for the NDSC and certain actions of the president require approval by the NDSC. Of the 11 members, the commander-in-chief appoints 5 members and controls 6 votes, guaranteeing the Tatmadaw (military) permanent control of a key part of the executive branch regardless of election results. The military reports directly reports to NDSC, effectively making the military unaccountable. The NDSC's existence is enshrined in Chapter V of the Constitution of Myanmar, and it was formed on 31 March 2011.

After President Win Myint refused to call a meeting of the NDSC to address the Tatmadaw’s baseless allegations of massive voter fraud in the 2020 general election, the military under the leadership of Commander-in-Chief Min Aung Hlaing executed a coup on 1 February 2021, removing Win Myint and installing Myint Swe as Acting President so he could call a meeting of the NDSC and transfer state power to Min Aung Hlaing. The NDSC has since continued to serve as the purported basis of legitimacy for Min Aung Hlaing’s military dictatorship.

The NDSC's constitutionally enshrined roles include expansive powers:
 Recommend pardonees for the President to grant amnesty
 Approve the President's act of severing foreign diplomatic relations
 Coordinate with the President to take military action against aggressors
 Approve the Tatmadaw's ability to conscript citizens
 Nominate a candidate for Commander-in-Chief of Defence Services, to be appointed by the president
 Coordinate with the President in declaring a state of emergency
 Exercise legislative, executive and judiciary powers during a state of emergency
 Exercise sovereign power during a state of emergency

Members

According to the Constitution, NDSC's membership must consist of the following individuals:
 President
 First Vice-President
 Second Vice-President
 Speaker of the Pyithu Hluttaw
 Speaker of the Amyotha Hluttaw
 Commander-in-Chief of the Defence Services
 Deputy Commander-in-Chief of the Defence Services
 Minister for Defence
 Minister for Foreign Affairs
 Minister for Home Affairs
 Minister for Border Affairs

National Defence and Security Council of Myint Swe (2021–present)

National Defence and Security Council of Win Myint (2018–2021)

National Defence and Security Council of Htin Kyaw (2016–2018)

National Defence and Security Council of Thein Sein (2011–2016)
As of 9 July 2013, NDSC was composed of the following members:

References

See also
 Government of Burma

Government agencies of Myanmar
Myanmar
2011 establishments in Myanmar
Government agencies established in 2011
Military of Myanmar
Military dictatorship in Myanmar